Aenictus longi is a species of tannish beige army ant found in Bangladesh, and India. The species has two subspecies, "Aenictus longi longi", and "Aenictus longi taivanae".

References

Dorylinae
Hymenoptera of Asia
Insects described in 1901